Paula Anne Southgate is a New Zealand politician. She has held several positions in local government since 2001. In October 2019 she was elected the Mayor of Hamilton and was re-elected in October 2022.

Early life
Southgate was born in 1963 or 1964 to Margaret Southgate and attended Hamilton Girls' High School and the University of Waikato. She worked as a teacher, a counsellor in the mental health sector, and served on two school boards of trustees.

Local government
Southgate served as a councillor on the Waikato Regional Council from 2001 to 2016. In 2013 she was elected to be the council chair over Bob Simcock, with the support of eight out of fourteen councillors.

She ran to be mayor of Hamilton and a Hamilton City Councillor in the 2016 local elections but lost to Andrew King. The election was close, with an election-day margin of nine votes reduced to six votes after a judicial recount. However, she was elected as a city councillor from the East ward. In the 2019 local elections, she did not run for a councillor position but won the mayoralty with 33.74% of the vote and a majority of 3,137 votes over King. Geoff Taylor was appointed as her deputy mayor.

Southgate sought and won a second mayoral term in the 2022 local elections.

Personal life
Southgate is married to Greg and has two daughters and a stepson.

References

1960s births
Living people
Mayors of Hamilton, New Zealand
People educated at Hamilton Girls' High School
University of Waikato alumni